Francis William Bridger (born 1951) is the current dean of Brechin in the Scottish Episcopal Church.

He was educated at Pembroke College, Oxford and ordained in 1979. After a curacy in Islington he was a lecturer at St John's College, Nottingham from 1982 until 1990; vicar of Woodthorpe from 1990 until 1999; principal of Trinity College, Bristol from 1999 until 2005; professor at the Fuller Theological Seminary in the United States from 2005; and rector of Broughty Ferry from 2012.

References
 

Alumni of Pembroke College, Oxford
Scottish Episcopalian clergy
Deans of Brechin
1951 births
Living people
People associated with Dundee
Staff of Trinity College, Bristol